Albinia Hobart (1737/8 – 11 March 1816) was an 18th-century British celebrity. She was the heiress of her father, and became the Countess of Buckinghamshire by marriage in 1793. Her lifestyle and size made her the subject and victim of cartoons by James Gillray and others; she figures in over 50 satirical prints.

Life
Hobart was born Albinia Bertie to Lord Vere Bertie and Anne Casey. Her mother's father was Sir Cecil Wray, 11th of the Wray baronets; Anne Casey was illegitimate but her father's heiress, left in his will dated 21 Jan 1735/6 £14,000 and all his estates. Albinia married George Hobart in 1757, and so became Countess of Buckinghamshire when he inherited the title in 1793. The Hobarts lived in Hobart House, Ham Common, in Richmond, London, supposedly based on the Frederick the Great's summer palace, Sanssouci. There Albinia organised lavish parties which included performances by her and her daughters.  These were attended by high society, including the royal princes.

The fashion at the time was for gambling, particularly with the card game Faro. She and other celebrities like Charles James Fox and Georgiana Cavendish were renowned for their indulgent gambling. The Hobarts were known for this extravagance. Despite not having a license she allowed her house to be used for high stake gambling. By this device she managed to lose money and to fall foul of the authorities. She was having fun and losing money and so was her husband.

He tried a number of careers with poor results and consoled himself with mistresses. Despite their other interests the couple had four daughters and three sons. Meanwhile the press saw her illegal gambling and indulgent parties as a legitimate target. The commentators at the time could not resist noting the growing size of Albinia and her love of extravagant fashion which was intended more for her daughters.

She became a prominent figure of the famous political battle of the general election of 1784 in the Westminster constituency. Charles James Fox's side had the glamorous Georgiana Cavendish, Duchess of Devonshire, accused by her opponents of kissing voters in the street for their pledges, and the other Hobart, the Countess of Buckinghamshire, supporting her relative Sir Cecil Wray, 13th Baronet.

On her husband's death in 1804, she became the Dowager Countess of Buckinghamshire. She died on 11 March 1816 in Nocton, where she was buried with her husband.

Family
She had eight children:
Robert Hobart, 4th Earl of Buckinghamshire (1760–1816)
Hon. George Vere Hobart (1761 – 5 December 1802), married first Jane Cataneo and had issue, married second, in April 1802, Janet Maclean and had issue
Lt. Charles Hobart, RN (d. April 1782)
Rev. Hon. Henry Lewis Hobart (1774 – 8 May 1846), married Charlotte Selina Moore and had issue
Lady Albinia Hobart (1759 – 1850), married Richard Cumberland on 14 July 1784  and had issue
Lady Henrietta Anne Barbara Hobart (c.1762 – 1828), married, in 1789, John Sullivan and had issue
Lady Maria Frances Hobart (c. 1762 – 1794), married George North, 3rd Earl of Guilford and had issue
Lady Charlotte Hobart (d. 1798), married Col. Edward Disbrowe (d. 1818) and had issue, including Edward Cromwell Disbrowe.

References 

1738 births
1816 deaths
18th-century English women
18th-century English people
Albinia
Buckinghamshire
English gamblers
Albinia